Grandval (meaning great valley in French) may refer to:

People
Charles-François Racot de Grandval (1710–84), French actor and playwright
Clémence de Grandval (1828–1907), French composer
Randoald of Grandval (died 675), Swiss saint

Places
Grandval, Puy-de-Dôme, commune in Puy-de-Dôme, France
Grandval, Switzerland, municipality in Berne, Switzerland
Lac de Grandval, lake in Cantal, France